Ronald E. "Ryan" Cleary (born November 20, 1966) is a Canadian politician and journalist from Newfoundland and Labrador, Canada. He was the Member of Parliament for St. John's South—Mount Pearl from 2011 to 2015.

Born in Gander and raised in Riverhead, Harbour Grace, and Bay Roberts, Cleary graduated from the journalism program at the Stephenville campus of the College of the North Atlantic in 1989. On May 2, 2011, Cleary was elected to the House of Commons as a member of the New Democratic Party in the 2011 election. He was defeated in the 2015 Canadian federal election, after which he switched parties to run as a Progressive Conservative in the 2015 Newfoundland and Labrador provincial election and was defeated in Windsor Lake. He was president of the Federation of Independent Seafood Harvesters (FISH-NL) from its founding to its dissolution.

Journalism
As a journalist, Cleary covered most of the major events in Newfoundland and Labrador over the past two decades. He was fisheries reporter for The Telegram in 1992 when the moratorium was first introduced on northern cod. He also worked as a political and investigative reporter.

Cleary was the editor-in-chief of The Independent newspaper and was known for his outspoken and controversial articles. For example, Cleary claimed in his columns that Quebec had too much power in Canadian government institutions and said that Canada's top two problems were Quebec and Quebec. Cleary also earned a reputation as a steadfast Newfoundland separatist, such as in May 2008, when he wrote "I don’t want to seem ungrateful, but now that we’re rolling in the cash it may be time to consider breaking away from the country of Canada.” When The Independent went out of business he went on to host Nightline, a VOCM radio call in program. Cleary also worked for The Newfoundland Herald and NTV.

Federal politics
Cleary first entered politics when he became the New Democratic Party (NDP) candidate in the riding of St. John's South—Mount Pearl in the October 2008 federal election. His candidacy led to some controversy for him and NDP leader Jack Layton for comments Cleary had written only a couple of years before when he was a journalist. Cleary had referred to NDP supporters as a "small pocket of aging granolas and artsy-fartsies" and that they were "a mainstream party that wouldn't win an election if Jackie Layton was given a 100-seat head start." Despite his late entrance into the campaign and his previous comments he still managed to place a strong second in the riding.

On September 17, 2009, the New Democrats nominated Cleary as their candidate in St. John's South-Mount Pearl for the next federal election. In October 2010, Cleary announced that he would withdraw his candidacy. He stated that being a political candidate had created a conflict with his journalism work and that he wished to continue with his journalism career. He also noted that he had severed all ties with the NDP. However, in March 2011 with the announcement of a federal election, Cleary said he would return to run for the NDP again. On May 2, Cleary defeated Liberal Siobhán Coady receiving 18,332 votes to Coady's 10,670.

After Lorraine Michael stepped down as the leader of the Newfoundland and Labrador New Democratic Party in early 2015, Cleary publicly mused running for the party's leadership in the 2015 leadership election, but ultimately decided to not seek the position.

In the 2015 federal election, Cleary was defeated by Liberal Seamus O'Regan. On election night, NDP leader Tom Mulcair called Cleary his “political hero”. He also supports ending the NDP's association with trade unions.

Provincial politics
After his defeat in the 2015 federal election, Cleary entered talks with the Progressive Conservative Party of Newfoundland and Labrador to run under their banner in the 2015 Newfoundland and Labrador general election. On October 30, Cleary announced that he would seek the party's nomination in the electoral district of Windsor Lake. He won the Progressive Conservative nomination but was defeated in the general election by Liberal incumbent Cathy Bennett.

Union activism
In 2016, Cleary started efforts to organize a new union of fish harvesters, to be called the Federation of Independent Seafood Harvesters, or FISH-NL, as a rival to the Fish, Food and Allied Workers union. Cleary travelled throughout the province signing up members for union certification, their application for union recognition was considered by the Labour Relations Board from 2016 to 2018. On September 28, 2018 the Labour Relations Board ruled that FISH-NL did not have enough support to trigger a ratification vote. On December 3, 2019, Cleary announced the disillusion of FISH-NL after it failed to gain the necessary 4000 signatures after a second membership drive to trigger a ratification vote.

Electoral history

Provincial

Federal

References

External links

Members of the House of Commons of Canada from Newfoundland and Labrador
New Democratic Party MPs
Progressive Conservative Party of Newfoundland and Labrador politicians
People from Gander, Newfoundland and Labrador
Politicians from St. John's, Newfoundland and Labrador
Living people
Canadian talk radio hosts
1966 births
Journalists from Newfoundland and Labrador
Candidates in Newfoundland and Labrador provincial elections
21st-century Canadian politicians